is a passenger railway station located in the city of Matsuyama, Ehime Prefecture, Japan. It is operated by the private transportation company Iyotetsu.

Lines
During most of the day, railway trains arrive every fifteen minutes. Trains continue from Matsuyama City Station on the Yokogawara Line to Yokogawara Station. The station is also served by the Ōtemachi Line, and Jōhoku Line light rail lines.

Layout
Komachi Station is an above-ground station with one island platform and one side platform for the Takahama Line and two opposed side platforms for the Ōtemachi and Jōhoku Line  services. The station is staffed. In the event of an emergency, the Takahama Line will return to this station or Mitsu Station. The Komachi Rolling Stock Depot is attached to the station, and there are facilities for inspection and maintenance.

Adjacent stations

|-
!colspan=5|Iyotetsu

History
It was renamed to its present name on 20 July 1889. The station was destroyed on 26 July 1945 during the Matsuyama Air Raid in World War II, and was rebuilt in 1949. The current station building is the third generation structure and was completed in 1977.

Surrounding area
The station is located on the outskirts of the center of Matsuyama City, and is lined with condominiums and office buildings. It is close to commercial facilities such as Kayamachi shopping street and Fuji Grand Matsuyama.

See also
 List of railway stations in Japan

References

External links

Iyotetsu Station Information

Iyotetsu Takahama Line
Railway stations in Ehime Prefecture
Railway stations in Japan opened in 1888
Railway stations in Matsuyama, Ehime